Novonazarovka is a rural locality (a selo) in Nekrasovsky Selsoviet of Belogorsky District, Amur Oblast, Russia. The population was 40 as of 2018. There are 2 streets.

Geography 
Novonazarovka is located 47 km south of Belogorsk (the district's administrative centre) by road. Nekrasovka is the nearest rural locality.

References 

Rural localities in Belogorsky District